A Natural Area of Special Interest (Spanish: Área Natural de Especial Interés, Catalan: Área natural d'especial interès; acronym: ANEI) is a protected area within the Balearic Islands, Spain that is below the level of a natural park. 

The law creating ANEIs, Law 1/1991, enacted on January 30, designated 47 ANEIs in Mallorca, 19 on Menorca, 10 on Ibiza and 8 on Formentera.

List of ANEIs

ANEIs on Majorca 

Puig de Maria, Pollença
S'Albufereta, Pollença

Sa Punta Manresa
La Victòria, Alcúdia
Puig de Sant Martí, Alcúdia

Serra de Son Fe
S'Albufera, Sa Pobla, Muro, Alcúdia
Sa Canova d'Artà, Artà

Cala Mesquida-Cala Agulla, Capdepera
Puig Segué
S'Heretat

Cap Vermell

Torrent de Canyamel
Serra de Son Jordi
Sa Punta de Capdepera, Capdepera
Sa Punta i s'Algar, Felanitx
Punta Negra-Cala Mitjana
Mondragó
Cap de ses Salines
Es Trenc-Salobrar de Campos, Campos
Marina de Llucmajor
Cap Enderrocat
Es Carnatge des Coll d'en Rabassa, Palma
Cap de Cala Figuera-Refeubeig, Calvià
Cap Andritxol, Andratx
Cap des Llamp
Es Saulet
Massís de Randa
Sant Salvador-Santueri, Felanitx
Puig de ses Donardes
Es Fangar
Dunes de Son Real, Santa Margalida

Muntanyes d'Artà
Punta de n'Amer, Sant Llorenç
Cales de Manacor
Na Borges
Calicant, Manacor i Sant Llorenç
Consolació
Puig de Sant Miquel, Montuïri
Son Cos

Gariga de Son Caulelles
Puig de Son Seguí
Puig de Son Nofre
Puig de Bonany
Puig de Santa Magdalena, Inca

Barrancs de Son Gual i Xorrigo, Palma
Àrees naturals de la Serra de Tramuntana

ANEIs on Menorca 
Costa nord de Ciutadella
La Vall
Dels Alocs a Fornells

La Mola i s'Albufera de Fornells
Bellavista
D'Addaia a s'Albufera
S'Albufera des Grau
De s'Albufera a la Mola
Sant Isidre-Binisermenya
Cala Sant Esteve-Caló d'en Rafalet
De Biniparratx a Llucalcari
Son Bou i Barranc de sa Vall
De Binigaus a Cala Mitjana
Costa Sud de Ciutadella
Son Oliveret
Camí de Baig (Degollador)
Santa Àgueda-s'Enclusa
El Toro
Penyes d'Egipte

ANEIs on Ibiza 
Ses Salines
Puig de Mussona i Puig de s'Eixeró
Cap Llibrell
Cala Jondal
Cap Llentrisca-Sa Talaiassa
Cala Compta-Cala Bassa
Serra de ses Fontanelles-Serragrossa
Del Puig d'en Basseta al Puig d'en Mussons
Àrees Naturals dels Amunts d'Eivissa
De Cala Salada al Port de Sant Miquel
Serra de Sant Mateu d'Aubarca
Del Port de Sant Miquel a Xarraca
De Xarraca a Sant Vicent de sa Cala
Punta Grossa
Serra Grossa de Sant Joan
Massís de Sant Carles
Serra des Llamp
Cap Roig
Talàia de Sant Carles

ANEIs on Formentera 
Ses Salines-S'Estany Pudent
S'Estany des Peix
Es Cap Alt
Cap de Barbaria
Es pi d'en Català
Platja de Migjorn i costa Tramuntana
La Mola
Punta Prima

External links

List of all ANEIs
Map of the ANEIs on Menorca
Text of law creating ANEIs

01
.x
A01
Nature conservation in Spain